The 1991 World Mountain Running Championships was the 7th edition of the global mountain running competition, World Mountain Running Championships, organised by the World Mountain Running Association and was held in Zermatt, Switzerland on 8 September 1991.

Results

Men
Distance 17.3 km, difference in height 1500 m (climb).

Men team

Men short distance

Men short distance team

Men junior

Men junior team

Women

Women team

References

External links
 World Mountain Running Association official web site

World Mountain Running Championships
World Long Distance Mountain Running